Rondotia is a genus of moths of the family Bombycidae erected by Frederic Moore in 1885.

Selected species
Rondotia diaphana (Hampson, [1893])
Rondotia lineata Leech, 1898
Rondotia menciana Moore, 1885

References

Bombycidae